Karaviq (also Romanized as Karavīq; also known as Karavī, Karvigh, Keyāralī, Kiarali, and Kyaraly) is a village in Bakrabad Rural District, in the Central District of Varzaqan County, East Azerbaijan Province, Iran. At the 2006 census, its population was 257, in 67 families.

References 

Towns and villages in Varzaqan County